Maryland City is a census-designated place (CDP) in Anne Arundel County, Maryland, United States. It is located east of Laurel, just over the border with Prince George's County, and it has a Laurel ZIP Code. Maryland City mostly consists of an older, compact housing development and is adjacent to Fort Meade army base. A large newer development (built mid-1990s) on the north side of Maryland Route 198 is known as Russett and is included within the Maryland City CDP.

Services
Maryland City is home to the Maryland City Volunteer Fire Department, which is part of the Anne Arundel County Fire Department. MCVFD Station 27 is located at 3498 Laurel Fort Meade Road. It is staffed 24 hours a day by four career firefighters, one of whom is an EMT-paramedic. The career staff is supplemented by volunteers.

History
Maryland City was developed by the Maryland City Corp, owned by developer Harvey Kayne. The  of eastern Laurel, Maryland, were purchased in 1960 for $3 million from a developer planning "Meade City". The concept was to build low-cost houses with ground-rent rather than ownership.

Geography
Maryland City is located at  (39.092561, −76.819419) in the westernmost corner of Anne Arundel County. It is bordered by Laurel in Prince George's County to the west, by the CDP of Scaggsville in Howard County to the north, by the CDP of Jessup to the northeast, and by Fort Meade to the east. Uninhabited portions of Fort Meade are to the south.

Access from the parkway to Maryland City is via Maryland Route 198 (Fort Meade Road). Maryland Route 32 (the Patuxent Freeway) forms the northeast edge of the CDP.

Demographics

2010

2000
As of the census of 2000, there were  people,  households, and  families residing in the CDP. The population density was  people per square mile (/km2). There were 2,666 housing units at an average density of /sq mi (392.9/km2). The racial makeup of the CDP was 62.93% White, 26.58% African American, 0.50% Native American, 5.27% Asian, 0.03% Pacific Islander, 1.94% from other races, and 2.76% from two or more races. Hispanic or Latino of any race were 4.95% of the population.

There were 2,575 households, out of which 33.3% had children under the age of 18 living with them, 47.5% were married couples living together, 13.8% had a female householder with no husband present, and 32.7% were non-families. 24.6% of all households were made up of individuals, and 3.9% had someone living alone who was 65 years of age or older. The average household size was 2.62 and the average family size was 3.13.

In the CDP, the population was spread out, with 26.5% under the age of 18, 8.8% from 18 to 24, 37.3% from 25 to 44, 19.8% from 45 to 64, and 7.6% who were 65 years of age or older. The median age was 33 years. For every 100 females, there were 95.6 males. For every 100 females age 18 and over, there were 94.0 males.

The median income for a household in the CDP was $, and the median income for a family was $. Males had a median income of $ versus $ for females. The per capita income for the CDP was $. About 2.1% of families and 3.6% of the population were below the poverty line, including 1.4% of those under age 18 and 4.3% of those age 65 or over.

References

External links

 
 
 American FactFinder for Maryland City: 

Census-designated places in Anne Arundel County, Maryland
Census-designated places in Maryland
Planned communities in the United States